Quincy High School may refer to one of several schools in the United States:

Quincy High School (Massachusetts) in Quincy, Massachusetts 
North Quincy High School in Quincy, Massachusetts
Quincy High School (Michigan) in Quincy, Michigan
Quincy High School (Washington) in Quincy, Washington
Quincy Junior-Senior High School in Quincy, California
Quincy Notre Dame High School in Quincy, Illinois
Quincy Senior High School in Quincy, Illinois